is a former Japanese football player.

Playing career
Yamamoto was born in Nagaokakyo on August 29, 1982. He joined J2 League club Kyoto Purple Sanga from youth team in 2001. However he could not play at all in the match. In 2002, he moved to J2 club Mito HollyHock. Although he played many matches in 2002 season, he could hardly play in the match in 2003 season. In 2004, he moved to Japan Football League (JFL) club ALO's Hokuriku. He played many matches as regular player in 3 seasons. In 2007, he moved to JFL club Rosso Kumamoto (later Roasso Kumamoto). Although he could hardly play in the match, the club was promoted to J2 end of 2007 season. He became a regular player in 2008 and played many matches in 2 seasons. In 2010, he moved to JFL club V-Varen Nagasaki. Although he played many matches as regular player in 2010, his opportunity to play decreased from 2012. In 2013, he moved to JFL club Kamatamare Sanuki. He became a regular player soon and the club was promoted to J2 end of 2013 season. Although he played many matches until 2016, his opportunity to play decreased in 2017. In 2018, he moved to Regional Leagues club Ococias Kyoto AC. He retired end of 2018 season.

Club statistics

References

External links

1982 births
Living people
Association football people from Kyoto Prefecture
Japanese footballers
J2 League players
Japan Football League players
Kyoto Sanga FC players
Mito HollyHock players
Kataller Toyama players
Roasso Kumamoto players
V-Varen Nagasaki players
Kamatamare Sanuki players
Association football midfielders